Jehu Mountain is a mountain located in the Catskill Mountains of New York east of Hancock. Hawk Mountain is located northwest and Coon Hill is located northwest of Jehu Mountain.

References

Mountains of Delaware County, New York
Mountains of New York (state)